Prauserella alba is a moderately halophilic bacterium from the genus Prauserella which has been isolated from saline soil in China.

References

Pseudonocardiales
Bacteria described in 2003